Mullaloo is a northern coastal suburb of Perth, Western Australia, within the City of Joondalup.

History
Mullaloo is named after an Aboriginal word, believed to mean "place of the rat kangaroo". It was first recorded in 1919 as Moolalloo Point, but the spelling was later changed to Mullaloo. Urban development began in the late 1950s.

Today
The Mullaloo Surf Life Saving club primary area of patrol is within 400 metres of the Mullaloo Surf Life Saving Club rooms and is patrolled every weekend and public holiday commencing October through to April. The club has row teams, swim teams, board teams and sprint teams.

Mullaloo has two schools, Mullaloo Beach Primary School and Mullaloo Heights Primary School.
Enrolment currently stands at 272 at Mullaloo Heights.

References

External links
 City of Joondalup - Mullaloo Beach

Suburbs of Perth, Western Australia
Suburbs in the City of Joondalup